Githima Village lies in Gatundu south, Kiambu County, Kenya. It is in ng'enda zone, kahugu-ini sub-location, prominent by swam that is located between githima village and kahugu-ini. It's an ancestral land for earlier maumau fighters

Populated places in Central Province (Kenya)